The 1975 Calabrian regional election took place on 15 June 1975.

Events
Christian Democracy was by far the largest party and Christian Democrat Pasquale Perugini formed a government with the support of the Italian Socialist Party and the other minor centre-left parties (Organic Centre-left). Perugini was replaced by Aldo Ferrara in 1976.

Results

Source: Ministry of the Interior

Elections in Calabria
1975 elections in Italy